Petra Priemer (now Brinkmann, born 6 February 1961 in Leipzig) is a German former swimmer who competed in the 1976 Summer Olympics.

References

1961 births
Living people
German female freestyle swimmers
Olympic swimmers of East Germany
Swimmers at the 1976 Summer Olympics
Olympic silver medalists for East Germany
Swimmers from Leipzig
World Aquatics Championships medalists in swimming
European Aquatics Championships medalists in swimming
Medalists at the 1976 Summer Olympics
Olympic silver medalists in swimming
20th-century German women
21st-century German women